Lingampet is a panchayat village in Kamareddy District in the state of Telangana in India.

Geography
Lingampet is located east of the south-flowing Allair River, a tributary of the Manjira River. Lingampet has an average elevation of 470 meters (1545 feet).

Mandal villages
Lingampet Mandal has sixteen panchayat villages each one of which manages one or more villages.  The panchayat villages are:

 Banapur
 Bhavanipet
 Bonal
 Jaldipalli
 Karpole
 Lingampalle (Khurd)
 Lingampet
 Mengaram
 Mothe
 Mumbajipet
 Nallamadugu
 Permalla
 Polkampet
 Pothaipalli
 S. Sangareddy
 Shetpally

Demographics
In the 2011 Census Lingampet Mandal had 48,961 inhabitants, 23,847 males and 25,114 females, all of them rural.
Naganna Bavi:
Constructed during the Kakatiya Rule, this ancient stepwell dates back to the 18th century and is still a sturdy structure despite being neglected and not taken care of. According to historians, Naganna Bavi is 100 feet deep and was built by Lingamma Desai to meet the drinking water and irrigation needs of the area. While Naganna Bavi was named after Jaksani Naganna who supervised the construction of this stepwell, Lingampet village was named in honor of Lingamma Desai.

References 

Villages in Nizamabad district